Legionowo  is a city in Masovia, east-central Poland.

Location

Currently this is the capital of Legionowo County (which is one of 38 land counties in Masovian Voivodeship.

Adjoining counties 

(from north, clockwise): Pułtusk County, Wyszków County, Wołomin County, Warsaw, Warsaw West County, Nowy Dwór County.

Education 
There are four high schools in the town of which three are public and one is private faith-based. 

Higher education is only currently represented by a police training academy. Between 2001 and 2006 a private Economic-Technical College was present in the town.

History 

 Legionowo's history dates back to 1877, when Jabłonna Nowa (New Jabłonna) rail station  was built. The name comes from Jabłonna, the nearby village, where in 1774-1779 Bishop Michał Poniatowski (brother of Poland's last king, Stanisław Poniatowski) built his palace Jabłonna Palace - now owned by the Polish Academy of Sciences.
 In 1892, the Russian army barracks (koszary carskie) were built near the railroad station and a local garrison of the Russian army was stationed there, as a part of Warsaw Stronghold Region, until the beginning of World War I, when this region was occupied by the German troops.
 In 1912, Legionowo is given a city rights.
 In 1919, Jabłonna Nowa was renamed as Legionowo to honour Polish Legions (Legiony Polskie).
 Ca. 1920 Institute of Aerology (currently Aerology Centre within Institute of Meteorology and Water Administration) was opened.
 During the Battle for Warsaw in August 1920, from barracks in Legionowo, General Żeligowski led the 10th Infantry Division to Radzymin, which helped to save Warsaw from the Red Army.
 In 1922, the Aviotex balloon and parachute factory, which also produced tents and other camping equipment (e.g. sleeping bags), opened in Legionowo.
 After 1925, Legionowo became a summer resort for inhabitants of Warsaw, as by that time, it was a wooded and unpolluted area.
 Between World War I and World War II, narrow-gauge railroad line connected Legionowo with Warsaw, going through Jabłonna.
 In 1930, Legionowo became a commune.
 During World War II, a ward of Stalag 368 (a prison camp for lower officers and soldiers) in Beniaminowo and a ghetto were located in Legionowo.
 During World War II, in 1944, Legionowo took part in Warsaw uprising, as so-called District 7: Collar. During the first week of August 1944, Legionowo was a place of regular fights between German troops and Polish rebels. After a week or so, Germans put down the uprising and several Poles were executed in one of the military shelters near the railroad line.
 After World War II, there was a brick factory, now non-existent.
 In the 1950s, the standard-gauge railroad line was electrified.
 In the late 1960s, a narrow-gauge railroad line was closed and in the early 1970s, the tracks were removed. The terminus and depot buildings remain, currently in private use.
 In the 1960s, the first 4-storey blocks of flats were built. In the 1970s and 1980s, three large groups of flats (4-storey and 11-storey) were built.
 In 1977, a tinware factory "Bistyp" was opened.
 In the early 1980s, a house factory was built near Legionowo, which made prefabricated elements for blocks of flats built in the region. The factory is now closed.
 In August 1990, the Police Training Centre, one of two such institutions in Poland, was opened.
 After the big flood in southern parts of Poland in 1997, the Aerology Institute was equipped with Doppler meteorological radar, able to scan about a fifth of Poland's area for storm and rain clouds. It is now part of SMOK (The Hydrological and Meteorological Monitoring Forecasting and Protection System, Polish: System Monitoringu i Osłony Kraju).
 In 2012, Legionowo hosted the Greek football team during the Euro 2012 football competition.

Railway station
One of the things to be found in Legionowo is the Legionowo railway station. As of 2011, it is served by Koleje Mazowieckie, who run the KM9 services from Warszawa Zachodnia or Warszawa Wola to Działdowo, Szybka Kolej Miejska, who run the S9 services from Warszawa Gdańska to Wieliszew and by Tanie Linie Kolejowe by their cross-country services to Kraków, Kołobrzeg, Olsztyn, Bielsko-Biała, Gdynia and also to Warszawa Zachodnia.

A major redevelopment of the station has been made between 2014 and 2016 with a large amount of the funding coming from Swiss Contribution. It included a transport hub, a multi-storey car park, shops and more.

Sport
The Legionovia Legionowo association football team is based at the local municipal stadium and play in the fourth division.

A club of the same name is also one of the top professional women's volleyball clubs, playing in the highest division.

The local arena hosts all the town's indoor sports clubs as well as music, MMA, boxing and other events.

Notable people
 Ola Jordan (born 1982), Ballroom Dancer
 Wojciech Lemański (born 1960), a suspended Roman Catholic priest

International relations

Twin towns — Sister cities
Legionowo is twinned with:

  Kovel, Ukraine 
  Sevlievo, Bulgaria  
  Jiujiang, China
  Carnikava, Latvia
  Borjomi, Georgia

Former twin towns:
  Rzhev, Russia (terminated due to the 2022 Russian invasion of Ukraine)

Sightseeing 

 Russian army barracks, made of red Russian bricks (larger than standard Polish ones)
 Wooden summer resort houses, nowadays some of them located in the centre of Legionowo
 St. Joseph's Church built in 1945
 Holy Spirit Church built in years 1979–1985 in place of an old wooden one.

References

External links
 Jewish Community in Legionowo on Virtual Shtetl

Cities and towns in Masovian Voivodeship
Legionowo County